Maja e Ershellit is a mountain in Albania. The mountain, rising 2,065 m high, is located in the Accursed Mountains range. It is situated north of the lake of Koman.

References

Mountains of Albania
Accursed Mountains